Return of the Mac is the first collaboration studio album by American rapper Prodigy of Mobb Deep and producer The Alchemist, released on March 27, 2007 through E1 Music. The album was intended to be a mixtape serving as a prequel to Prodigy's next album, H.N.I.C. Pt. 2, but was released as a traditional album due to the unexpected level of quality of the record. The album was produced by The Alchemist (who is featured on the cover) and it features songs sampled from the Blaxploitation era.

Return of the Mac debuted at number thirty-two on the Billboard 200, selling 27,000 copies in its first week. As of December 2007, the album had sold 130,000 copies. The album had three singles with music videos directed by DanTheMan: "Mac 10 Handle", "New York Shit", and "Stuck on You".

Track listing

Charts

References

2007 albums
E1 Music albums
Prodigy (rapper) albums
Albums produced by the Alchemist (musician)
Mafioso rap albums